Syuldyukar (Sülcükeer) is a rural locality (a selo), the only inhabited locality, and the administrative center of Sadyinsky National Evenk Rural Okrug of Suntarsky District in the Sakha Republic, Russia, located  from Mirny, the administrative center of the district. Its population as of the 2010 Census was 318, down from 359 recorded during the 2002 Census.

References

Notes

Sources
Official website of the Sakha Republic. Registry of the Administrative-Territorial Divisions of the Sakha Republic. Mirninsky District. 

Rural localities in Mirninsky District